Luisa María Álvarez Iglesias (born October 3, 1962 in Candás) is a Spanish sprint canoer who competed in the early 1990s. She was eliminated in the semifinals of the K-4 500 m event at the 1992 Summer Olympics in Barcelona.

References

 Sports-Reference.com profile

1962 births
Canoeists at the 1992 Summer Olympics
Living people
Olympic canoeists of Spain
Spanish female canoeists